Max Myers is a British film director, screenwriter and novelist who has been active in Los Angeles since the mid-1990s.

His first feature film, Don't Let Go, won the Outstanding Directorial Achievement award at the 2002 Stony Brook Film Festival in New York, the Best Picture Award at the Westchester Film Festival (NY)  and a Prism Award in Los Angeles.

He was the writer of the feature film Irish Jam starring comedian Eddie Griffin and Anna Friel and has written a handful of violent crime novels including the award-winning, Boysie Blake Problem Solver.

The son of a German woman and an English Army sergeant, Myers was born in Iserlohn, Germany and lived in a large number of postings during his youth including South Australia and Gibraltar and eventually ended up in East London where he was an amateur boxer and musician through his teens, then began working as a tour manager and sound mixer for European bands that included famous musicians from Manfred Mann, Mungo Jerry, Berlin Rock Ensemble, Moonraker and Wings (band).

Filmography

Feature films
 "Don't Let Go" (2002) - writer, director
 "Irish Jam" (2006) 
 "Slip Tumble & Slide" (2010) -  writer director 
 "Joyful Noise" (2012) writer

Short films
 "The Test Of Time" (2015) writer

Bibliography
 "Boysie Blake" (2014) - crime, suspense novel

References

External links
 
 

American male novelists
Year of birth missing (living people)
American film directors
People from Iserlohn
American screenwriters
Living people